Dhekiajuli Assembly constituency is one of the 126 assembly constituencies of Assam Legislative Assembly. Dhekiajuli forms part of the Tezpur Lok Sabha constituency.

Dhekiajuli Assembly constituency

Following are details on Dhekiajuli Assembly constituency-

Country: India.
 State: Assam.
 District: Sonitpur district .
 Lok Sabha Constituency: Tezpur Lok Sabha/Parliamentary constituency.
 Assembly Categorisation: Rural constituency.
 Literacy Level:81.66%.
 Eligible Electors as per 2021 General Elections: 2,17,380 Eligible Electors. Male Electors:1,10,867 . Female Electors: 1,06,511 .
 Geographic Co-Ordinates:   26°49'05.2"N 92°28'06.6"E.
 Total Area Covered:  748 square kilometres.
 Area Includes: Dhekiajuli thana (excluding Barchalla and Borgaon mouzas) in Tezpur sub-division, of Sonitpur district of Assam:.
 Inter State Border :Sonitpur.
 Number Of Polling Stations: Year 2011-232,Year 2016-233,Year 2021-71.

Members of Legislative Assembly
Following is the list of past members representing Dhekiajuli Assembly constituency in Assam Legislature-

 1957: Omeo Kumar Das, Indian National Congress.
 1962: Omeo Kumar Das, Indian National Congress.
 1967: P. Das, Indian National Congress.
 1972: Hiranya Bora, Indian National Congress.
 1978: Pratap Kalita, Indian National Congress.
 1985: Hiranya Bora, Indian National Congress.
 1991: Hiranya Bora, Indian National Congress.
 1996: Joseph Toppo, Asom Gana Parishad.
 2001: Joseph Toppo, Asom Gana Parishad.
 2006: Joseph Toppo, Asom Gana Parishad.
 2009: Bhimananda Tanti, Indian National Congress.
 2011: Habul Chakraborty, Indian National Congress.
 2016: Ashok Singhal, Bharatiya Janata Party.
 2021: Ashok Singhal, Bharatiya Janata Party.

Election results

2016 result

References

External links 
 

Assembly constituencies of Assam